Werner Modes (born 12 September 1949) is a German ice hockey player. He competed in the men's tournament at the 1972 Winter Olympics.

References

External links
 

1949 births
Living people
German ice hockey players
Olympic ice hockey players of West Germany
Ice hockey players at the 1972 Winter Olympics
Sportspeople from Füssen